J. Patrick O'Neill (born January 14, 1971) is an American attorney and Democratic member of the Rhode Island House of Representatives, representing the 59th District since 2005. He is currently serves on the House Committees on Judiciary, and Rules. On February 11, 2010, he was elected as Majority Whip of the House of Representatives

References 

He stepped down as House Majority Whip under suspicious circumstances in October 2012.

External links
Rhode Island House - Representative J. Patrick O'Neill official RI House website

Colby College alumni
Democratic Party members of the Rhode Island House of Representatives
Rhode Island lawyers
1971 births
Living people
Politicians from Pawtucket, Rhode Island